KLND (89.5 FM) is a non-commercial radio station licensed to serve Little Eagle, South Dakota, United States. The station is owned by Seventh Generation Media Services, Inc. It airs a Variety format with news, public affairs, music and cultural programming for the people of Standing Rock and Cheyenne River and surrounding areas. The station's name in Lakota is Wolakota Wiconi Waste, meaning "through unity a good life."

The station was assigned the KLND call letters by the Federal Communications Commission on April 28, 1995.

See also
List of community radio stations in the United States

References

External links
 https://www.klndradio895.com/ - Official website

Native American radio
LND
Community radio stations in the United States
Corson County, South Dakota